Musian District is a district (bakhsh) in Dehloran County, Ilam Province, Iran. At the 2006 census, its population was 16,275, in 2,678 families.  The District has one city: Musian.  The District has three rural districts (dehestan): Abu Ghoveyr Rural District, Dasht-e Abbas Rural District, and Nahr-e Anbar Rural District.

References 

Districts of Ilam Province
Dehloran County